Jon Chol-ho (born 7 April 1969) is a North Korean former weightlifter, who competed in the middleweight class and represented North Korea at international competitions. He won the bronze medal at the 1989 World Weightlifting Championships in the 75 kg category. He won the bronze medal at the 1996 Summer Olympics in the 76 kg event. He also participated at the 1992 Summer Olympics in the 82.5 kg event and 2000 Summer Olympics in the 77 kg event. He won the gold medal at the 1990 Asian Games in the Lightweight class.

References

1969 births
Living people
North Korean male weightlifters
World Weightlifting Championships medalists
Place of birth missing (living people)
Olympic weightlifters of North Korea
Weightlifters at the 1992 Summer Olympics
Weightlifters at the 1996 Summer Olympics
Weightlifters at the 2000 Summer Olympics
Olympic medalists in weightlifting
Olympic bronze medalists for North Korea
Medalists at the 1996 Summer Olympics
Weightlifters at the 1990 Asian Games
Asian Games medalists in weightlifting
Asian Games gold medalists for North Korea
Medalists at the 1990 Asian Games
21st-century North Korean people
20th-century North Korean people